Kissi (or Kisi) is a Mel language of West Africa, There are two dialects, northern and southern, and both are tonal languages.  The northern dialect is spoken in Guinea and in Sierra Leone. The southern dialect is spoken in Liberia and Sierra Leone.  The two dialects are notably different, but are closely related.

In Guinea, the main places Kissi is spoken are the cities of Kissidougou and Guéckédou and their préfectures.

Phonology

Vowels

Consonants 

Kissidougou dialects preserve a distinction between /r/ and /l/ phonemes that have been merged as allophones in dialects south of Guéckédou. For instance, "la huŋ" means exactly the same as "ra huŋ". Also, "Thank you" is realized as "barika" around Kissidougou and "balika" south of Guéckédou.

The voiced labial-velar stop /gb/ occurs only in onomatopoeic phrases, and medial gb can be regarded as an allophone of its voiceless counterpart.

gbaala 'outdoor kitchen'
Gbaŋgbaŋ (a river in Kissidougou)
gbɛŋgbɔ 'stool'
maagbana 'city taxi'

Tone 
Kissi has four tones: two register and two contour. The two register tones are level and high, and the two contour tones are a rising mid tone and the a falling high tone. Kissi also has an extra-high tone, but occurs only sparingly, functioning in only a few grammatical contexts.

Grammar (northern Kissi)

Pronouns

As you can already see from these examples, verbs aren't conjugated like English verbs, but they are inflected by tone.

Articles
Definite and indefinite articles do not exist in Kissi, so "muɛi" means "the knife" as well as "a knife".
If an object has to be defined (because there are more than one, for example), "this" is used:

example: muɛi coŋ - this knife

If that is not exact enough, an object is described using adjectives.

yɔŋgu ya muɛi. / k'ya muɛi. - Give me a/the knife.

yɔŋgu ya muɛi bɛndɛi. / k'ya muɛi bɛndɛi. - Give me the big knife.

References

G. Tucker Childs. A Grammar of Kisi, A Southern Atlantic Language. 1995. 370 pp.
G. Tucker Childs: A Dictionary of the Kisi Language. With an English-Kisi Index
Denise Paulme. Les Gens du Riz: Les Kissi de Haute-Guinée. Paris. Librairie Plon. 1954, 1970. 324 pp. Online version

External links
UCLA Phonetics Lab Archive - Sound Files Kissi-Northern
Sound Files - KQS Kissi-Northern at globalrecordings.net
Sound Files - KSS Kisi-Southern (Gissi) at globalrecordings.net
Sound Files - The complete New Testament in Kisi (Select language "Kisi Southern")
Sample text at language-museum.com

Mel languages
Languages of Liberia
Languages of Guinea